Cathy Wong is a municipal politician in Montreal, Quebec, Canada. She has served on Montreal City Council as councillor for the Peter-McGill district since 2017, and is the speaker of Montreal City Council. At 30 years old on her election, she is the first person of Chinese descent to serve at City Hall as the council's first female speaker. She was also the first opposition party member to sit in the chair. She replaces Frantz Benjamin, the first black speaker of the council.

As part of her role, Wong is mandated to raise citizens' access to city hall and municipal democracy, especially for women, youth, ethnic minorities, new residents, and Indigenous people, key targets in mayor Valérie Plante's election campaign. A Montreal diversity and inclusion advisory panel was a move by mayor Plante, with a one-year deadline to recommend necessary changes at city hall and related bodies.

Also under Wong's presidency, Montreal planned to rescind an historical but uncodified regulation which required male councilors to wear ties at council meetings. A city council commission supervising procedural rules and conduct, which she leads, decided to drop the rule to modernize City Hall.

As a member of the City of Montreal’s Executive Committee, she oversaw diversity, employment inclusion, the French language, and the fight against racism and discrimination.

Wong was a member of the Équipe Denis Coderre party (before its post-election reconstitution as Ensemble Montréal) in the municipal elections of November 2017. On October 2, 2019, she joined the governing Projet Montréal party, citing its social values.

Honours and awards
In 2016, the Conseil des diplômés de la Faculté de droit de l'UQAM presented Wong with an award for contribution to upcoming generations;
Wong had earned a bachelor's degree in civil law from UQAM.

References 

Year of birth missing (living people)
Living people
Montreal city councillors
Women municipal councillors in Canada
21st-century Canadian politicians
21st-century Canadian women politicians
Canadian politicians of Chinese descent
Université du Québec à Montréal alumni
Independent politicians in Canada